Hellesdon is a village and suburb of Norwich in the District of Broadland in Norfolk, England. Norwich International Airport is located In the parish.

History 
Hellesdon has signs of very early settlement. A variety of flint instruments have been unearthed in and around Hellesdon, thought to date back at least 4,000 years. A collection of bronze axe heads were found near Hellesdon Hall, and a skeleton dating from around 600 AD was discovered next to Hellesdon Lodge in Low Road.

The Dictionary of British Place-names indicates that the name Hellesdon comes from Hægelisdun (the spelling of the location c.985), meaning 'hill of a man named Hægel', with the spelling having changed to Hailesduna by 1086. Hægelisdun is recorded in tradition as the location where King Edmund was killed by Viking invaders in 869, although there is no consensus on the location of this event.

Hellesdon was one of several manors owned in the fifteenth century by Sir John Fastolf, the original of Shakespeare's Falstaff, and as with other of his properties, his death in 1459 led to something close to a private war between the Paston family and John de la Pole, 2nd Duke of Suffolk for its possession.

In the 1880s, the railway reached Hellesdon, linking it to nearby Norwich, bur Hellesdon railway station closed in the 1950s. In 1915 Mann Egerton built H1s, Spads and Type B seaplanes in Hellesdon. In the 1920s, construction of the Norwich ring road began, making Hellesdon much more accessible.

From 1930 to 1964, motorcycle speedway team the Norwich Stars raced at the old Firs raceway. Ove Fundin was World Speedway Champion on a number of occasions in the early 1960s. The stadium was sold for housing in 1964, bringing the Norwich Stars speedway team to an end.

The area has now developed into a major suburb of Norwich.

Amenities 
Hellesdon has a number of small independent shops. A large Asda superstore opened in 1983, and a petrol filling station was added to the store site in 1990. The area also has a B&Q store, six schools (one high school, two junior schools and three infant schools), and Norwich International Airport. The high school, Hellesdon High School, is a leading-edge academy. Norwich airport is owned by the Rigby Group, and flights travel to destinations throughout Europe, as well as the British Isles.

There is a library, and a community centre for use by local clubs such as Hellesdon Horticultural Association and the Hellesdon Community Choir. The local football team, Hellesdon FC, play at the community centre. The community centre was used to hold the World Cycle Speedway championships in 1987.

There are two pubs in Hellesdon, The Whiffler and The Chestnut Tree, which was formally called The Bull. The roundabout adjacent to The Chestnut Tree is still referred to as “The Bull roundabout” and some residents objected to the name change as The Bull had a long history in the area. The former pub The Man On The Moon is now the Hellesdon doctor's surgery. Another former pub, The Bignold Arms, is now a fish restaurant and takeaway, and "The Firs" is now a Tesco Express. The Falcon became a Co-op Daily, but this closed in 2019. The building is now an office location.

There are several other leisure destinations including Funky's roller skating club and a snooker hall. There are also several parks and green spaces although the golf course has been sold for further residential housing developments, potentially increasing the village population significantly.

Hellesdon has a large psychiatric hospital (Hellesdon Hospital) but many of the former ward buildings are no longer occupied and the upper level of the site is destined to be sold for housing development. Situated next to the hospital, is the East of England Ambulance Service Norwich Office, which includes its AOC (Ambulance Operations Centre), Helledson Response Post and a Training Centre, along with a vehicle workshop. 

The parish church of St Mary dates from the 15th century and is a grade II* listed building.

Hellesdon was one of the places in Norfolk depicted by the Norfolk School artist, John Middleton.

Notes

External links 

Villages in Norfolk
Broadland
Civil parishes in Norfolk
Areas of Norwich